The Centro de Astrofísica da Universidade do Porto (Centre for Astrophysics of the University of Porto - CAUP) is the largest astronomy research institute in Portugal, with more than 60 people. Since 2000 it has been evaluated as Excellent by international panels, organized under the auspices of the national science foundation (Fundação para a Ciência e Tecnologia - FCT), which was created in May 1989 by the Universidade do Porto. It is a private research institute, non-profit making and recognized as being of public utility by the Portuguese Government.

Its objectives include the promotion and support of astronomy through
 research
 education at graduate and undergraduate levels
 activities for primary and secondary schools
 science outreach and the popularisation of astronomy

CAUP is responsible for the scientific management of the planetarium of Porto.

Research teams
 Origin and Evolution of Stars and Planets - Star Formation and Early Evolution; Planetary Systems (Exoplanets); Stellar Populations and Stellar Evolution
 Galaxies and Observational Cosmology - Physical properties of massive galaxies; Galaxy cluster astrophysics; Structure formation paradigms; Dynamical dark energy; Varying fundamental constants

Directors

 Maria Teresa V. T. Lago (1989–2005)
 Mário João P. F. G. Monteiro (2006–2012)
 Pedro Pina Avelino (2013–2014)
 João José F. G. A. Lima (2015–present)

References

External links
 Official site
 Facebook
 Twitter
 Youtube channel
 Faculty of Sciences of U.Porto
 University of Porto

University of Porto
Astronomy institutes and departments
Astrophysics institutes